Mohammad Ali Sarlak (born March 25, 1970, Iran) is a professor of organizational behavior management at Payame Noor University (PNU), and the former chancellor of  this university as the largest public university in Iran. He introduced the concept of  the organization’s face  for the first time in a multi volume reference book entitled The new faces of organizations in the 21st century. Sarlak was honored by the Iranian house of humanities thinkers in 2019.

Education
 Ph.D: Organizational Behavior Management, University of Tehran, 2005.
 M.B.A: University of Tehran, 1995.
 B.S: Business Administration, University of Tehran, 1993.

Concepts
Much of prof. sarlak's works concentrated on Advancing the boundaries of management knowledge. Some of his new ideas and conceptualizations are as follows:
 The organizational Rip currents
 The Commotion–result Theory 
  Management by Reaction
 The organizational Climate Inversion
 The Behavioral Entropy
 The organizational Life Expectancy

Positions
 The chancellor of Payame Noor University (PNU) (2014–2015).
 The head of Post Graduate Center of Payame Noor University (2007–2018).\
 A member of Executive Committee of AAOU (Asian Association of Open Universities) in 2015
 A board member of Iranian Academy of Management sciences (2016).
 A member of the Central promotion Committee of the Ministry of Science, Research and Technology (2015–present).
 A member of the National Committee of UNESCO (2015–present).
 The Establisher of a UNESCO Chair on Environmental Education
 A member of policymaking and scientific council of Iran Inventions Grand Prize

Journals Editor in chief
 Iranian journal of Management of public organizations (2013–present)
 International Journal of the Academy of Organizational Behavior Management, CANADA(2012–2014).
 International Journal of E-Entrepreneurship and Innovation (IJEEI), IGI, USA (2010–2012).

Published books
 The New Faces of Organizations in the 21st Century (5 volumes), NAISIT, 2011, Canada
 E-Banking and Emerging Multidisciplinary Processes, IGI, 2011, USA
 Barriers of E-Commerce Acceptance in Export, Lambert, 2011, USA
 The Emerging Faces of Organizations in the 21st Century (4 volumes), Knowledge Reference Publisher, 2013, Iran
 The organizations in knowledge Era, Payame Noor Publisher, edition 2, 2012, Iran
 Advanced Management Information Systems, Payame Noor Publisher, second edition, 2011, Iran
 Healthy Organization in Practice, Knowledge Reference Publisher, 2014, Iran
 E-Government, Knowledge Reference Publisher, 2013, Iran
 Managing Organizational trauma, Mir Mah Press, 2016, Iran
 Trauma Management from Islam View point., Mir Mah Press, 2016, Iran
 The new era of management, (Richard L. Daft): Translated to Persian by Dr. Sarlak, Gostareh, Press, 2008, Iran

Research works
He has published over one hundred scientific papers and directed more than 250 master's thesis and doctoral dissertations.

References

 List of business theorists
Academic staff of Payame Noor University
Living people
1970 births
University of Tehran alumni